Leandro Rocha dos Santos, commonly known as Leandro (born 13 December 1987 in São Paulo city, São Paulo) is a Brazilian football player at the position of striker.

He scored once for Clube Atletico Juventus during the 2010 Copa Paulista.

He previously played for Palmeiras B.

References

1987 births
Living people
Brazilian footballers
Sociedade Esportiva Palmeiras players
Association football forwards
Footballers from São Paulo